Ephesus Cemetery is a historic cemetery just north of Emmet, Arkansas, on United States Route 67.  The cemetery was listed on the National Register of Historic Places in 2009.

History 
The cemetery, which was probably laid out in 1860 when the adjacent Ephesus Primitive Baptist Church was founded, is a small plot containing 68 marked graves with legible dates, six with markers but illegible dates, and 27 known unmarked graves.  The oldest dated burial is 1876; the cemetery contains the graves of many of Emmet's early settlers, and is the last surviving element of that time (the church having been replaced in the mid-20th century).

See also
 National Register of Historic Places listings in Nevada County, Arkansas

References

External links
 

Cemeteries on the National Register of Historic Places in Arkansas
Buildings and structures completed in 1876
National Register of Historic Places in Nevada County, Arkansas
1876 establishments in Arkansas
Primitive Baptists
Baptist Christianity in Arkansas
Cemeteries established in the 1870s